Summer Close-Up is a Canadian current affairs television series which aired on CBC Television in 1977.

Premise
Episodes consisted of a mix of public affairs content such as documentaries and studio interviews. These mostly addressed subjects of national concern such as the Royal Commission on Violence in the Communication Industry, fishing quotas and the prison system. The series included biographical segments featuring Michel Brault (film producer), David Crombie (then mayor of Toronto) and Jacques Dextraze (military chief).

Scheduling
This half-hour series was broadcast on Thursdays at 9:00 p.m. (Eastern time) from 26 May to 4 August 1977.

References

External links
 

CBC Television original programming
1977 Canadian television series debuts
1977 Canadian television series endings
1970s Canadian television news shows
1970s Canadian documentary television series